The Sciberras Peninsula is a peninsula in the South Eastern Region of Malta, between the Grand Harbour in the south and Marsamxett Harbour in the north. At its end stands the Mount Sciberras, which gave its name to the peninsula. During the Arab occupation the peninsula was called Mu'awiya, which has been taken up in Maltese as Xagħriet Mewwija (uncultivated and undulating heaths).

Valletta, the capital of Malta, is located on the Sciberras Peninsula, as is its suburb Floriana.

Some authors maintain that the name comes from the old Maltese family name Sciberras or Xiberras, who would have owned the land. Recent scholarly studies indicate that the phrase Xeberras is a Punic phrase which means the headland, or the middle peninsula, which is exactly the geographic characteristic of the Valletta-Floriana peninsula.

References

Bibliography 

Peninsulas of Malta